The 2017 V.League 1 (known as the Toyota V.League 1 for sponsorship reasons) season was the 61st season of the V.League 1, the highest division of Football in Vietnam. The season began on 7 January 2017 and ended on 25 November 2017. The season was twice interrupted due to the Vietnam Football Federation's decision to stop the league for 4 weeks due to the 2017 FIFA U-20 World Cup, and then again for 7 weeks for the 29th SEA Games.

Changes from the previous season

Team changes
The following teams have changed division since the 2016 season.

To V.League 1
Promoted from V.League 2
 Ho Chi Minh City FC

From V.League 1
Relegated to V.League 2
 Dong Thap FC

Rule changes
There is no longer a play-off match this season, so there is only one direct relegation spot.

Names changes
In January 2017, Hanoi T&T were renamed Hanoi FC and QNK Quang Nam were renamed Quang Nam FC.

Stadium changes
SHB Danang moved into Hoa Xuan Stadium from Chi Lang Stadium.

Teams

Personnel and kits

Managerial changes

Foreign players
Teams are allowed to use two foreign players and one naturalised player. Hanoi FC and Than Quang Ninh are allowed to have four foreign players (at least one AFC player) to play AFC Cup.

 Foreign players who left their clubs after first leg or be replaced because of injuries.

League table

Results

Positions by round
This table lists the positions of teams after each week of matches. In order to preserve the chronological evolution, any postponed matches are not included to the round at which they were originally scheduled, but added to the full round they were played immediately afterwards. For example, if a match is scheduled for matchday 13, but then postponed and played between days 16 and 17, it will be added to the standings for day 16.

Season progress

Season statistics

Top scorers

Own goals

Hattrick

 Note:
4: scored 4 goals

Awards

Monthly awards

No awards in May and August

Annual awards

Manager of the Season
 Hoang Van Phuc (Quang Nam FC)

Best player of the Season
 Dinh Thanh Trung (Quang Nam FC)

Best young player of the Season
 Nguyen Quang Hai (Hanoi FC)

Best Referee
 Vo Minh Tri

Best Assistant Referee
 Nguyen Trung Hau

Dream Team

Goal of the month

Attendances

By club

By round

Highest attendances

References

2017
2017 in Asian association football leagues
2017 in Vietnamese football